Table tennis at the 2010 Commonwealth Games was held at the  Yamuna Sports Complex  from 4 to 14 October 2010.

Venues
Jawaharlal Nehru Stadium
Jamia Millia Islamia (training venue)

Medal table

Medallists

Participating nations

See also
Commonwealth Table Tennis Championships

References

 
2010 Commonwealth Games events
2010
Commonwealth Games
Table tennis competitions in India